Listed below are the dates and results for the 1974 FIFA World Cup qualification rounds for the Asian and Oceanian zone (AFC and OFC). For an overview of the qualification rounds, see the article 1974 FIFA World Cup qualification.

India, Sri Lanka and the Philippines withdrew before the matches were played. The remaining 15 teams were divided into 2 zones, based on geographical and political considerations, as follows:

Format
 Zone A had 7 teams (teams from East Asia, plus Israel). All matches were played in Korea Republic. There would be four stages of play:
 Classification matches: All teams except Korea Republic would be paired up to play preliminary matches to determine group classification.
 Group stage: Based on the results of the classification matches, the 7 teams were divided into 2 groups (Group 1 with 3 teams and Group 2 with 4 teams). The teams played against each other once. The group winners and runners-up would advance to the semifinals.
 Semifinals: The winner of Group 1 played against the runner-up of Group 2 in a single match, and the winner of Group 2 played against the runner-up of Group 1 in a single match. The winners would advance to the Final.
 Final: The 2 teams played against each other in a single match. The winner would advance to the Final Round.
 Zone B had 8 teams (teams from West Asia and Oceania, plus Indonesia and Korea DPR). There would be two stages of play:
 Group stage: The 8 teams were divided into 2 groups of 4 teams each. The teams played against each other twice (Group 1 in Iran and Group 2 in Australia and New Zealand). The group winners would advance to the final.
 Final: The 2 teams played against each other on a home-and-away basis. The winner would advance to the Final Round.
In the Final Round, the winners of Zone A and Zone B played against each other on a home-and-away basis. The winner would qualify.

First round 

All matches played in Seoul, South Korea.

Zone A classification matches

Second round

Zone A

Group 1

Group 2

Zone A play-offs

Zone A Semi-finals

Zone A Final

Zone B

Group 1
All matches played in Tehran, Iran in a double round-robin format

Group 2
All matches played in Australia in a double round-robin format (except New Zealand–Australia first leg)

Zone B play-offs

Zone B Final

 
Australia won 3–2 on aggregate.

Third round

Second round final

 

Australia and South Korea tied 2–2 on aggregate; a final play-off was decided.

Second round final play-off
 

Australia won 1–0.

Qualified teams
The following team from OFC qualified for the final tournament.

1 Bold indicates champions for that year. Italic indicates hosts for that year.

Goalscorers

5 goals

 Moshe Onana

4 goals

 Adrian Alston
 Sabah Hatim

3 goals

 Attila Abonyi
 Ray Baartz
 Jimmy Mackay
 Parviz Ghelichkhani
 Chung Kyu-Poong
 Kim Jae-Han
 Joseph Chahrestan

2 goals

 Branko Buljevic
 Ernie Campbell
 Ray Richards
 Yuen Kuen-Chu
 Iswadi Idris
 Sarman Panggabean
 Ali Kadhim
 Riyadh Nouri
 Zvi Rozen
 Itzhak Shum
 Mordechai Spiegler
 Kunishige Kamamoto
 Hamad Bo Hamad
 Alan Vest
 Ma Jung-U
 Cha Bum-Kun

1 goal

 Doug Utjesenovic
 Peter Wilson
 Kwok Ka-Ming
 Lo Hung-Hoi
 Andjas Asmara
 Ali Jabbari
 Akbar Kargarjam
 Mehdi Monajati
 Ali Parvin
 Mohammad Sadeghi
 Gholam Vafakhah
 Douglas Aziz
 Bashar Rashid
 Salah Obeid
 George Borba
 Zvi Farkash
 Shusaku Hirasawa
 Koji Mori
 Ibrahim Al Duraihem
 Fathi Kameel
 Shaharuddin Abdullah
 Harun Jusoh
 Dennis Tindall
 Brian Turner
 An Se-Uk
 Kim Jong-Min
 Pak Sung-Jin
 Ko Jae-Wook
 Park Yi-Chun
 Nabil Nano
 Samir Said
 Abdulghani Tatiche

1 own goal

 Bobby Hogg (playing against New Zealand)
 Maurice Tillotson (playing against Indonesia)
 Nguyễn Vinh Quang (playing against Japan)
 Supakit Meelarpkit (playing against South Vietnam)

Notes

External links
 Results at RSSSF

AFC and OFC
FIFA World Cup qualification (AFC)
FIFA World Cup qualification (OFC)
Qual
qual
qual
FIFA World Cup